An economist is a professional and practitioner in the social science discipline of economics.

The individual may also study, develop, and apply theories and concepts from economics and write about economic policy. Within this field there are many sub-fields, ranging from the broad philosophical theories to the focused study of minutiae within specific markets, macroeconomic analysis, microeconomic analysis or financial statement analysis, involving analytical methods and tools such as econometrics, statistics, economics computational models, financial economics, mathematical finance and mathematical economics.

Professions

Economists work in many fields including academia, government and in the private sector, where they may also "study data and statistics in order to spot trends in economic activity, economic confidence levels, and consumer attitudes. They assess this information using advanced methods in statistical analysis, mathematics, computer programming [and] they make recommendations about ways to improve the efficiency of a system or take advantage of trends as they begin."
In addition to government and academia, economists are also employed in banking, finance, accountancy, commerce, marketing, business administration, lobbying and non- or not-for profit organizations.

In many organizations, an "Economic Analyst" is a formalized role. Professionals here are employed (or engaged as consultants) to conduct research, prepare reports, or formulate plans and strategies to address economic problems.  Here, as outlined, the analyst provides forecasts, analysis and advice, based upon observed trends and economic principles; this entails also collecting and processing economic and statistical data using econometric methods and statistical techniques.
Economic analysts employed in industry typically advise corporations' and financial institutions' reinvestment and capital budgeting decisions, and provide long term economic forecasts used within these organizations more generally. 
In the public sector, analysts advise legislators and executives on economic policy, public works, and related; politicians often consult economists before enacting economic policy; and many statesmen have academic degrees in economics. 
A Federal Government Economic Analyst conducts economic analysis of issues directly related to the function of their federal government agency.

In contrast to regulated professions such as engineering, law or medicine, there is not a legally required educational requirement or license for economists. In academia, most economists have a Ph.D. degree in Economics. In the U.S. Government, on the other hand, a person can be hired as an economist provided that they have a degree that included or was supplemented by 21 semester hours in economics and three hours in statistics, accounting, or calculus.
In fact, a professional working inside of one of many fields of economics or having an academic degree in this subject is often considered to be an economist;

see Bachelor of Economics and Master of Economics.

By country
Economics graduates are employable in varying degrees depending on the regional economic scenario and labour market conditions at the time for a given country. Apart from the specific understanding of the subject, employers value the skills of numeracy and analysis, the ability to communicate and the capacity to grasp broad issues which the graduates acquire at the university or college. Whilst only a few economics graduates may be expected to become professional economists, many find it a base for entry into a career in finance – including accounting, insurance, tax and banking, or management; 
see financial analyst.
A number of economics graduates from around the world have been successful in obtaining employment in a variety of major national and international firms in the financial and commercial sectors, and in manufacturing, retailing and IT, as well as in the public sector – for example, in the health and education sectors, or in government and politics. Small numbers go on to undertake postgraduate studies, either in economics, research, teacher training or further qualifications in specialist areas.

Brazil
In Brazil, unlike most countries in the world where the profession is not regulated, the profession of Economist is regulated by Law. 1411 of August 13, 1951. The professional designation of economist, according to the said law, is exclusive to the bachelors in economics graduates in Brazil.

United States

According to the United States Department of Labor, there were about 15,000 non-academic economists in the United States in 2008, with a median salary of roughly $83,000, and the top ten percent earning more than $147,040 annually. Nearly 135 colleges and universities grant around 900 new Ph.D.s every year. Incomes are highest for those in the private sector, followed by the federal government, with academia paying the lowest incomes. As of January 2013, PayScale.com showed Ph.D. economists' salary ranges as follows: all Ph.D. economists, $61,000 to $160,000; Ph.D. corporate economists, $71,000 to $207,000; economics full professors, $89,000 to $137,000; economics associate professors, $59,000 to $156,000, and economics assistant professors, $72,000 to $100,000.

United Kingdom
The largest single professional grouping of economists in the UK are the more than 3500 members of the Government Economic Service.

Analysis of destination surveys for economics graduates from a number of selected top schools of economics in the United Kingdom (ranging from Newcastle University to the London School of Economics), shows nearly 80 percent in employment six months after graduation – with a wide range of roles and employers, including regional, national and international organisations, across many sectors. This figure compares very favourably with the national picture, with 64 percent of economics graduates in employment.

Notable economists

Some current well-known economists include:

Adam Smith, Scottish economist and philosopher. Known as "The Father of Economics".
John Maynard Keynes, English economist well known for forming the basis of Keynesian economics
Joan Robinson, English Keynesian economist.
Karl Marx, German philosopher and economist known for founding Marxian Economics.
Rosa Luxemburg, German Communist revolutionary and the first economist woman to bring a theoretic contribution to the field of economics. She is the author of The Accumulation of Capital. 
 Amartya Sen (b. 1933), Nobel Memorial Prize in Economic Sciences laureate and professor at Harvard University.
 Kenneth Arrow, Nobel Memorial Prize in Economic Sciences laureate and professor at Stanford University.
Robert Aumann (b. 1930), Israeli-American mathematician, Nobel Memorial Prize in Economics in 2005.
 B. R. Ambedkar, Indian scholar, jurist, economist, politician and social reformer. The Reserve Bank of India was conceptualized in accordance with the guidelines presented by Ambedkar to the Hilton Young Commission (also known as Royal Commission on Indian Currency and Finance) based on his book, The Problem of the Rupee – Its Origin and Its Solution.
Ben Bernanke, Chairman of the Federal Reserve from 2006 to 2014.
Esther Duflo, Nobel Memorial Prize in Economic Sciences laureate and professor at Massachusetts Institute of Technology.
Milton Friedman, Nobel Memorial Prize in Economic Sciences laureate.
Claudia Goldin, professor at Harvard University
 Alan Greenspan, Chairman of the Federal Reserve from 1987 to 2006.
James Heckman, 2000 Nobel Prize winner and Professor at University of Chicago; most cited economist as of 2018.
 Glenn Hubbard, Dean of the Columbia University Graduate School of Business; Chair of the Council of Economic Advisers from 2001 to 2003.
 Thomas M. Humphrey, American economist and historian of economic thought.
Paul Krugman, 2008 Nobel Memorial Prize in Economic Sciences laureate, public intellectual, and advocate of modern liberal policies.
 Greg Mankiw, American macroeconomist, academic economist, public intellectual, Chair of the Council of Economic Advisers from 2003 to 2005.
 Joseph Stiglitz, 2001 Nobel Memorial Prize in Economics winner, critic of inequality and the governance of globalization, and former World Bank Chief Economist.
 Dambisa Moyo, Zambian-born international economist and author who analyzes the macroeconomy and global affairs.
Thomas Sowell, American economist and social theorist, Senior Fellow at the Hoover Institution.
Robert Lucas Jr., 1995 Nobel Prize in Economics winner.
Carmen Reinhart, member of American Economic Association,  2018 King Juan Carlos Prize in Economics winner.
William Forsyth Sharpe, 1990 Nobel Memorial Prize in Economic Sciences winner.
Christopher Antoniou Pissarides, 2010 Nobel Prize in Economics winner.
Arthur Laffer, 2019 Presidential Medal of Freedom winner.
Jeffrey Sachs, Professor of Sustainable Development at Columbia's School of International and Public Affairs, 2015 Blue Planet Prize winner.
Ludwig von Mises, Austrian economist and philosopher, author of Human Action.
Friedrich Hayek, Austrian economist, Nobel Memorial Prize in Economic Sciences laureate and author of The Road to Serfdom.
David Ricardo,  developed the classical theory of comparative advantage in 1817.

See also

 Chief economist
 List of economists

References

Citations

Sources 

 Mark Blaug and Howard R. Vane (1983, 2003 4th ed.). . Table of Contents links. Cheltenham & Edward Elgar Pub.
Pressman, Steven, 2006. Fifty Major Economists. Routledge,
Robert Sobel, 1980. The Worldly Economists .

External links

Economics occupations
Social science occupations